Jamestown (also known as Jimtown) is an unincorporated community in Baugo Township, Elkhart County, Indiana.

History
Jamestown was officially established as a village in 1835, a few years after eight families formed a settlement at the location, which was near a Potawatomi community. It was named for its founder, James Davis.

Geography
Jamestown is traversed by Baugo Creek, with the Saint Joseph River to the north.

Education
The community's schools are operated by the Baugo Community Schools district, with approximately 1900 students, and include Jimtown High School, Jimtown Junior High School, and Jimtown Elementary School. The Jimtown school mascot is the Jimmie.

References

Further reading
 

Unincorporated communities in Elkhart County, Indiana
Unincorporated communities in Indiana
Populated places established in 1835
1835 establishments in Indiana